Carniodus is a conodont genus from the Silurian.

References

External links 

 Carniodus at fossilworks.org (retrieved 3 May 2016)

Ozarkodinida genera
Silurian conodonts
Paleozoic life of Ontario